PQS can refer to:
 Personnel Qualification Standard, a set of tasks and examinations in the United States Navy
 Passive Q-switching
 Parallel Quantum Solutions, a computational chemistry computer program
 The Protein Quaternary Structure Server, an important resource in structural biology
 Potential Quadruplex-forming Sequence, in molecular biology a DNA or RNA sequence capable of forming a G-quadruplex